Beeville is a city in Bee County, Texas, United States, with a population of 13,669 at the 2020 census. It is the county seat of Bee County and home to the main campus of Coastal Bend College. The area around the city contains three prisons operated by the Texas Department of Criminal Justice.

Many of the stately homes, commercial buildings, and schools in the area, including the Bee County Courthouse, were designed by architect William Charles Stephenson, who came to Beeville in 1908 from Buffalo, New York. Beeville is a national Main Street city. Gutzon Borglum, the sculptor of Mount Rushmore, and his son Lincoln, lived in the city during the time Rushmore was being sculpted.

History and culture 

The original and official site on the Poesta River was first settled by the Burke, Carroll, and Heffernan families in the 1830s.  Present-day Beeville was established on a 150-acre land donation made by Ann Burke in May 1859, after the Republic of Texas was annexed by the United States. It was first named "Maryville" for pioneer Mary Heffernan.

It was renamed "Beeville" after Barnard E. Bee, Sr., who had served as Secretary of State and Secretary of War for the Republic of Texas. It was called "Beeville-on-the-Poesta,"  with a nearby community called "Beeville-on-the-Medio" seven miles (11 km) to the west. The first post office opened in 1859.

In 1886, the first railroad was constructed through Beeville, stimulating the growth of the economy and population. The Southern Pacific Transportation Company operated these railroads until the early 1970s.

Beeville was incorporated as a town in 1890, but the incorporation was dissolved the following year. Beeville was reincorporated as a town again in 1908.

The city streets were paved in 1921.

The Rialto Theater, one of the Beeville structures designed by W. C. Stephenson, cost $25,000. The Rialto opened on August 19, 1922, with the silent film The Three Musketeers starring Douglas Fairbanks, Sr. Admission was twenty-five cents for adults and ten cents for children. The theater is now used for special occasions and live performances.

The Texas oil boom brought in many new residents, which grew the population of the city to 4,806 in 1930.

In September 1942, Alfred Irving, who is believed to be one of the final chattel slaves in the United States, was freed at a farm near Beeville. Alex L. Skrobarcek and his daughter, Susie, were arraigned and eventually convicted for their crimes.

The United States Navy operated the Beeville Naval Air Station, which trained Navy airplane pilots during World War II from 1943 through 1946. The base was reopened in 1952 as Naval Air Station Chase Field, continuing in operation until 1992.

By 1950, the population more than doubled to 9,348.

Beeville was served by Trans-Texas Airways (TTA) during the 1950s.  TTA operated scheduled passenger flights with Douglas DC-3 prop airliners from Chase Field with service to Brownsville, Corpus Christi, Harlingen, Houston, San Antonio and other destinations in Texas.

Geography
The city's terrain ranges from flat to gently rolling slopes, set in the South Texas Brush Country.

Beeville is located between San Antonio and Corpus Christi. Travel time to Corpus Christi is approximately one hour by car, and travel time to San Antonio is approximately 1 hours by car.

Climate
The climate in this area is characterized by hot, humid summers and generally mild to cool winters.  The temperature is influenced by the warm waters of the nearby Gulf of Mexico. Prevailing southerly winds of 8 to 10 miles per hour (13 to 16 km/hr) come off the Gulf. Annual rainfall is about 30 inches (76 cm), fairly evenly distributed throughout the year. According to the Köppen Climate Classification system, Beeville has a humid subtropical climate, abbreviated "Cfa" on climate maps.

Demographics

2020 census

As of the 2020 United States census, there were 13,669 people, 4,890 households, and 3,164 families residing in the city.

Government and infrastructure
The Beeville City Council consists of Mayor Brian Watson, Mayor Pro-Tempore Michael Willow Jr., Councilman Benny Puente, Councilman Alexis Bledsoe, and Councilman Darryl Martin.

The city has nine parks scattered among the neighborhoods, with a swimming pool at Martin Luther King-City Pool Park.

Prisons
The Texas Department of Criminal Justice operates the Correctional Institutions Division Region IV Office on the grounds of the Chase Field Industrial Complex, the former Naval Air Station Chase Field, in Beeville. In addition, Garza East Unit and Garza West Unit transfer facilities are co-located on the grounds of the naval air station; and the McConnell Unit lies about  outside the city limits. The Beeville Distribution Center is on the grounds of the air station.

Joseph T. Hallinan, the author of the 2001 book Going Up the River: Travels in a Prison Nation, described Beeville as a prison town. At the time Beeville was trying to attract more prison business since the employment is stable. Hallinan wrote that Beeville was attempting to be "a prison hub, becoming roughly what Pittsburgh is to steel or Detroit is to cars".

Education
Beeville is served by the Beeville Independent School District, which has approximately 3,500 students in six schools.

A C Jones High School contains a turfed football stadium and a softball and baseball complex. Sports include: golf, basketball, baseball, softball, powerlifting, soccer, tennis, track, wrestling, and cheerleading. The teams are the Trojans and Lady Trojans, and their colors are orange and white. Other extra-curricular programs include the Dazzlers Dance Team, band, choir, and theater arts.

The main campus of Coastal Bend College in Beeville opened in 1967 with 790 students. Today it has over 3,700 students, more than 1,200 of them full-time. Dormitories and apartments on campus provide affordable housing. The community college offers an associate degree in 26 different fields.  (Other campuses are in Alice, Kingsville and Pleasanton.)

Library
The Joe Barnhart Bee County Library is located in downtown Beeville, directly across the street from the Bee County Courthouse.

Art museum
The Beeville Art Museum is a teaching museum, relying on traveling exhibitions. It is housed in the Esther Barnhart House. The house was built in 1910 by the R.L. Hodges family and occupied by their descendants until 1975. In 1981, the Hodges house and adjacent acreage were purchased by Dr. Joe Barnhart of Houston. He named the house the Esther Barnhart House in honor of his mother. He then developed the land into a park for the community. He named the park the Joe Barnhart Park in honor of his father.

Notable people

 
 Byron Bradfute, National Football League player
 James Gunn, Princeton astronomer, 2008 National Medal of Science
 Rudy Jaramillo, Major League Baseball player and coach
 Cyndi Taylor Krier, San Antonio politician, born in Beeville in 1950
 Edmundo Mireles Jr., FBI agent involved in the 1986 FBI Miami shootout
 Marianne Rafferty, Fox News presenter and reporter
 Eddie Taubensee, Major League Baseball player
 Curt Walker, was a professional baseball player who played outfield for the Philadelphia Phillies

References

External links

City of Beeville official website
Beeville Bee-Picayune—the local newspaper
Photos of Beeville and NAS Chase Field, April 2007

Cities in Texas
County seats in Texas
Micropolitan areas of Texas
Cities in Bee County, Texas
Populated places established in 1859
1859 establishments in Texas